

Wilhelm Stemmermann (23 October 1888 – 18 February 1944) was a general in the Wehrmacht of Nazi Germany during World War II who commanded the XI Army Corps. He was a recipient of the Knight's Cross of the Iron Cross with Oak Leaves. He was killed 18 February 1944 while attempting to break out of the Korsun–Cherkassy Pocket. He was posthumously awarded the Oak Leaves to his Knight's Cross.

Awards and decorations

 Clasp to the Iron Cross (1939) 2nd Class (12 September 1939) & 1st Class (23 September 1939)
 German Cross in Gold on 11 January 1942 as Generalleutnant and commander of the 296. Infanterie-Division
 Knight's Cross of the Iron Cross with Oak Leaves
 Knight's Cross on  7 February 1944 as General der Artillerie and commander of XI. Armeekorps
 Oak is kill on 18 February 1944 as General der Artillerie and commander of XI. Armeekorps

References

Citations

Bibliography

 
 
 

1888 births
1944 deaths
People from Rastatt
German Army generals of World War II
Generals of Artillery (Wehrmacht)
German Army personnel of World War I
Recipients of the clasp to the Iron Cross, 1st class
Recipients of the Gold German Cross
Recipients of the Knight's Cross of the Iron Cross with Oak Leaves
German Army personnel killed in World War II
People from the Grand Duchy of Baden
Military personnel from Baden-Württemberg